Papatoetoe is a former New Zealand parliamentary electorate, and is part of greater Auckland.

Population centres
The 1977 electoral redistribution, initiated by Robert Muldoon's National Government, was the most overtly political since the Representation Commission had been established in 1886 through an amendment to the Representation Act. As part of the 1976 census, a large number of people failed to fill out an electoral re-registration card, and census staff had not been given the authority to insist on the card being completed. This had little practical effect for people on the general roll, but it transferred Māori to the general roll if the card was not handed in. Together with a northward shift of New Zealand's population, this resulted in five new electorates having to be created in the upper part of the North Island. The electoral redistribution was very disruptive, and 22 electorates were abolished, while 27 electorates were newly created (including Papatoetoe) or re-established.

The electorate is urban-suburban, based on the suburb of Papatoetoe, and was in Manukau City, South Auckland. At various times it also included parts of the suburbs of Otara, Wiri, and Mangere. The Papatoetoe electorate was eventually absorbed into Mangere and the newly created  electorates for the 1996 election.

History
In the 1978 election, the Papatoetoe electorate was won by Eddie Isbey, who had been MP for the  electorate since . When the Papatoetoe electorate was abolished in 1996, Robertson transferred to the Manukau East electorate, which he represented until 2014.

Members of Parliament
Key

Election results

1993 election

1990 election

1987 election

1984 election

1981 election

1978 election

Notes

References

Historical electorates of New Zealand
Politics of the Auckland Region
1978 establishments in New Zealand
1996 disestablishments in New Zealand